is a 2004 Japanese drama film written and directed by Mitsuhiro Mihara. It won the Golden Goblet Award for Best Feature Film at the 2005 Shanghai International Film Festival.

Cast
Tatsuya Fuji as Kenichi Takahashi
Ken Kaitō
Tomoyo Harada
Mao Miyaji
Ren Osugi
Pace Wu

References

External links

2004 films
2004 drama films
Japanese drama films
Films set in Tokushima Prefecture
2000s Japanese films